The Just for Laughs Museum was a Canadian museum that opened in 1993, dedicated to humour (mainly stand-up comedy) located in Montreal, Quebec. The museum closed in 2011. It had been visited by more than two million people since its opening.

History 

The Just for Laughs Museum was created by Gilbert Rozon, founder of the Just for Laughs festival in the same city 10 years earlier. Opened in 1993, the museum was a venue for all things funny with displays, exhibitions, and a multi-functional space for the presentation of public, private or professional events.  The museum was located at 2111, boulevard Saint Laurent (2111, Saint Laurent Boulevard), Montreal, QC, Canada. Perhaps coincidentally, St-Laurent is the French name of Lawrence of Rome, the patron saint of comedians.

The museum was affiliated with the Canadian Museums Association, the Canadian Heritage Information Network, and the Virtual Museum of Canada.

Closure 
The museum closed its doors permanently on January 1, 2011, due to loss of profits associated with the maintenance costs for the over one hundred-year-old building.

References

External links 

 
 Just for Laughs

Museums in Montreal
Media museums
Performing arts museums
Defunct museums in Canada
Just for Laughs
Museums established in 1993
Museums disestablished in 2010
1993 establishments in Quebec
2010 disestablishments in Quebec